Scrooge (released as A Christmas Carol in the United States) is a 1951 British Christmas fantasy drama film and an adaptation of Charles Dickens's A Christmas Carol (1843). It stars Alastair Sim as Ebenezer Scrooge, and was produced and directed by Brian Desmond Hurst, with a screenplay by Noel Langley.

The film also features Kathleen Harrison as Mrs. Dilber, Scrooge's charwoman. George Cole stars as the younger Scrooge, Hermione Baddeley as Mrs. Cratchit, Mervyn Johns as Bob Cratchit, Clifford Mollison as Samuel Wilkins, a debtor; Jack Warner as Mr. Jorkin, a role created for the film; Ernest Thesiger as Jacob Marley's undertaker; and Patrick Macnee as the younger Jacob Marley.

Michael Hordern plays Jacob Marley's ghost, as well as the older Jacob Marley. Peter Bull serves as narrator, by reading portions of Charles Dickens' words at the beginning and end of the film; he also appears on-screen as one of the businessmen talking with Scrooge (at the beginning of the film) and discussing Scrooge's funeral (as witnessed by Scrooge with the Ghost of Christmas Yet-to-Come).

Plot 

On Christmas Eve 1843, the tight-fisted Ebenezer Scrooge tells two businessmen that he has no intention of celebrating Christmas. At his workplace, he refuses to donate to two men collecting for the poor. His nephew, Fred, invites him to dinner the next day, but Scrooge refuses, disparaging Fred for having married against Scrooge's will. Scrooge reluctantly gives his poor clerk Bob Cratchit Christmas off since there will be no business for Scrooge during the day, but expects him back to work earlier the next day. Scrooge returns home and sees the door-knocker transform into the face of his seven year-dead partner, Jacob Marley. Inside the house, Jacob Marley appears as a ghost before Scrooge, warning that he must repent or suffer being forever walking the earth bound in chains after death, as he has. He further warns Scrooge that he will be visited by three spirits; the first will arrive at one o'clock in the morning. Frightened by the visitation, Scrooge takes refuge in his bed.

At one o'clock, the Ghost of Christmas Past arrives. Scrooge is shown himself alone at school, unwanted by his father ever since his mother died in childbirth. His beloved sister Fan arrives to take him home, telling her brother that their father has recently had a change of heart toward Ebenezer. The Spirit shows Scrooge the annual Christmas party thrown by his former benevolent employer Fezziwig. He watches his proposal to his sweetheart Alice, who accepts his ring. He is then shown how he is tempted to leave Fezziwig's to join a business run by Mr. Jorkin, where he meets Jacob Marley. After Jorkin's firm buys up Fezziwig's business, Alice breaks her engagement to Scrooge because of his dedication to "a golden idol". Scrooge witnesses the death of Fan, who had just given birth to his nephew Fred, and discovers he missed her last words asking him to look after her son. Years later, when Jorkin is found to have embezzled funds from their now-bankrupt company, Scrooge and Marley make good on the missing funds, on condition they be allowed to control the company. On Christmas Eve 1836, Scrooge refuses to leave work early to visit Marley, who is on his deathbed. When Scrooge finally arrives, Marley, knowing he will be punished for his misdeeds, tries to warn Scrooge against his avarice before he dies. The Spirit reproaches Scrooge for taking Marley's money and house, as an ashamed Scrooge finds himself back in his bed.

Scrooge is visited by the Ghost of Christmas Present who takes him to see how "men of goodwill" celebrate Christmas. He shows him poor miners joyfully singing Christmas carols and the Cratchits' warm Christmas celebration on Christmas Day. Scrooge asks whether their disabled child, Tiny Tim, will survive his physical condition, but the Spirit hints that he will not unless the future changes. They next visit Fred's Christmas party, where Fred defends his uncle from his guests' snide remarks. Alice is working in a poorhouse, where she lovingly ministers to the sick and homeless. When Scrooge is unable to tell the Spirit that he may profit by what he has seen, the Spirit shows him two emaciated children – personifying Ignorance and Want – and pointedly mocks and scourges Scrooge with the miser's very own words when Scrooge shows concern for their welfare: "Are there no prisons? Are there no workhouses?".

Scrooge encounters the Ghost of Christmas Yet-to-Come, who shows him the Cratchits mourning Tiny Tim's death. He then watches as three people, including his charwoman Mrs. Dilber, sell off the possessions of a dead man and two businessmen discussing the man's upcoming funeral. When shown the man's grave bearing his own name, Scrooge begs the Spirit for a second chance, pleading "I'm not the man I was". He finds himself in his own bed to learn from Mrs. Dilber that it's Christmas Day and gleefully realizes he still has an opportunity to make amends. Though Mrs. Dilber is initially frightened by his transformation, Scrooge reassures her and promises to raise her salary. He anonymously purchases a prize turkey for the Cratchits and sends it to them as a gift. He later delights Fred by attending his dinner party and dancing with his once-estranged niece-in-law.

The next day, Scrooge plays a practical joke on Bob Cratchit, pretending to be about to scold him for being late, but instead gives him a raise, and asks to help Bob raise his family. Scrooge becomes "as good a man as the old city ever knew" and a second father to Tiny Tim, who does not die and recovers.

Featured cast

 Alastair Sim as Ebenezer Scrooge
 Kathleen Harrison as Mrs. Dilber, Charwoman
 Mervyn Johns as Bob Cratchit
 Hermione Baddeley as Mrs. Cratchit
 Michael Hordern as Jacob Marley's Ghost
 George Cole as Young Ebenezer Scrooge
 Glyn Dearman as Tiny Tim
 John Charlesworth as Peter Cratchit
 Michael J. Dolan as the Ghost of Christmas Past
 Francis de Wolff as the Ghost of Christmas Present
 Czesław Konarski as the Ghost of Christmas Yet-to-Come
 Rona Anderson as Alice, Scrooge's past fiancée 
 Carol Marsh as Fan "Fanny" Scrooge
 Jack Warner as Mr. Jorkin, Scrooge's second employer
 Roddy Hughes as Mr. Fezziwig, Scrooge's first employer
 Patrick Macnee as the Young Jacob Marley
 Brian Worth as Fred, Scrooge's nephew
 Olga Edwardes as Fred's wife
 Miles Malleson as Old Joe
 Ernest Thesiger as Mr. Stretch (the undertaker) 
 Louise Hampton as the Laundress
 Peter Bull as First Businessman at exchange (also Narrator)
 Douglas Muir as Second Businessman at exchange
 Noel Howlett as First Collector for people in need
 Fred Johnson as Second Collector for people in need
 Eliot Makeham as Mr. Snedrig
 Henry Hewitt as Mr. Rosebed
 Hugh Dempster as Mr. Groper
 Eleanor Summerfield as Miss Flora, Fred's party guest
 Richard Pearson as Mr. Tupper, Fred's party guest
 Clifford Mollison as Samuel Wilkins, Scrooge's poor client
 Hattie Jacques as Mrs. Fezziwig
 Theresa Derrington as Fred's Maid
 David Hannaford as Boy buying prize turkey
 Catherine Leach as Belinda Cratchit
 Moiya Kelly as Martha Cratchit
 Luanne Kemp as Mary Cratchit
 Maire O'Neill as older Alice at the Charity Hospital
 Anthony Wager as Mr. Fezziwig's Lad
 Derek Stephens as a Dancer at Fezziwig's
 Vi Kaley as Old Lady sitting by stove at the Charity Hospital

Production 
Teresa Derrington, who played Fred's maid and gives Scrooge quiet encouragement to see Fred, said Alastair Sim was not as encouraging to her during filming, and asked her sneeringly if it was her first film role.

Music 

Richard Addinsell wrote several pieces for the film's underscore, ranging from dark and moody to light and joyous. One of the more notable tunes is a polka, used in the two different versions of Fred's dinner party: the one Scrooge observes while with the Ghost of Christmas Present, and the other with Scrooge attending the party after atoning for his past coldness to Fred and his wife. The tune is similar to a traditional Slovenian polka called "Stoparjeva" ("hitch-hiker") or just "Stopar".

The film also contains excerpts from some traditional Christmas carols and other tunes. "Hark! The Herald Angels Sing" is sung over part of the opening credits, and by the miners when Scrooge is with the Ghost of Christmas Present. An instrumental version of "I Saw Three Ships" is played when Scrooge gives a coin to Mrs. Dilber, and again just before the end of the film. "Silent Night" is played and sung at various times, including over the last part of the final scene and "The End".

The English country dance "Sir Roger de Coverley" is played and danced during the scene where Scrooge visits the office of Old Fezziwig with The Ghost of Christmas Past.

The tragic folk song "Barbara Allen" is played as an instrumental when young Scrooge is talking with his sister Fan, and sung by a duet at Fred's Christmas party. Scrooge turns up in the middle of the line "Young man, I think you're dying", thereby causing the singers to stop before the last two words.

Comparison with the source material
In the film, Mrs. Dilber is the name of the charwoman, whereas in the book the woman was unnamed and the laundress was named Mrs. Dilber. The charwoman's role is greatly expanded in the film, to the point that she receives second billing in the list of characters.

The film also expands on the story by detailing Scrooge's rise as a prominent businessman. He was corrupted by a greedy new mentor, Mr. Jorkin (played by Jack Warner, a familiar British actor at the time) who lured him away from the benevolent Mr. Fezziwig and also introduced him to Jacob Marley. When Jorkin, who does not appear at all in Dickens's original story, is discovered to be an embezzler, the opportunistic Scrooge and Jacob Marley offer to compensate the company's losses on the condition that they receive control of the company for which they work – and so, Scrooge and Marley is born.

During the Ghost of Christmas Present sequence, Scrooge's former fiancée, Alice, works with the homeless and sick.  The character is named "Belle" in the book, and becomes a happily-married mother of several children.

The film also posits that Ebenezer's sister died while giving birth to his nephew, Fred, thus engendering Scrooge's estrangement from him. The film also reveals that Ebenezer's mother died while giving birth to him. This causes his father to resent him just as Ebenezer resents his nephew, and also means that Ebenezer has to either be younger than Fan, or Fan must be his half-sister. In the book, Fan is much younger than Ebenezer, and the cause of her death is not mentioned.

Release 
The film was released in Great Britain under its original title, Scrooge. United Artists handled the U.S. release under the title A Christmas Carol. The film was originally slated to be shown at New York City's Radio City Music Hall as part of their Christmas attraction, but the theatre management decided that the film was too grim and did not possess enough family entertainment value to warrant an engagement at the Music Hall. Instead, the film premiered at the Guild Theatre (near the Music Hall, and not to be confused with the Guild Theatre which showcased plays) on 28 November 1951.

Home media 
The film was released on Blu-ray in 2009 by VCI, in a package that also included a DVD copy of the film, cropped into a faux widescreen format. This package only contained minimal bonus features. It was issued again on Blu-ray in 2011 with a remastered transfer, and many bonus features that did not appear in the first Blu-ray edition.

Reception

Box-office 
The film was one of the most popular in Britain in 1952, but was a box office disappointment in the United States.

However, the film became a holiday favourite on American television where it was broadcast regularly during the 1950s and 1960s.

Critical reaction 
Bosley Crowther of The New York Times posted a favourable notice, writing that producer Brian Desmond Hurst "has not only hewed to the line of Dickens' classic fable of a spiritual regeneration on Christmas Eve, but he has got some arresting recreations of the story's familiar characters. The visions of Scrooge's life story are glimpses into depressing realms, and the aspects of poverty and ignorance in 19th century England are made plain. To the credit of Mr. Hurst's production, not to its disfavour, let it be said that it does not conceal Dickens' intimations of human meanness with artificial gloss." Richard L. Coe of The Washington Post was also positive: "This may not be A Christmas Carol of recent tradition, but I've an idea it's the way Dickens would have wanted it. It's the way he wrote it." Harrison's Reports called the film "delightful entertainment", finding that "though it does have its somber moments, it ends on so cheerful a note that one cannot help but leave the theatre in a happy mood." John McCarten of The New Yorker was also mostly positive, writing that "there's enough good here to warrant the attendance of all save the hardest of heart."

Variety, however, called the film "a grim thing that will give tender-aged kiddies viewing it the screaming-meemies, and adults will find it long, dull and greatly overdone." Time magazine ran a mixed review, criticising the direction while praising the performances. In Britain, The Monthly Film Bulletin was also mixed, finding that the film "as a whole lacks style" and that Sim resembled more a "dour dyspeptic" than a miser, but nevertheless concluded that "the film may please in its good-natured reminder of Christmas joys, and much praise is due to Kathleen Harrison for her inimitable playing of the true Cockney."

See also
 List of Christmas films
 List of ghost films
 List of A Christmas Carol adaptations

References

External links

 
 
 
 
 

1951 films
1950s fantasy films
1950s ghost films
Films based on A Christmas Carol
Films set in 1843
Films set in the Victorian era
British Christmas films
Films directed by Brian Desmond Hurst
British black-and-white films
United Artists films
Films scored by Richard Addinsell
1950s Christmas films
Films with screenplays by Noel Langley
British fantasy films
1950s English-language films
1950s British films
Films shot in London